is a dam in Taketa, Ōita Prefecture, Japan, completed in 2010.

References 

Dams in Ōita Prefecture
Dams completed in 2010

ja:稲葉ダム